"Moment's Notice" is a "classic" jazz standard composed by John Coltrane. The song was featured on Coltrane's noted 1958 recording Blue Train.

History
Coltrane never recorded "Moment's Notice" after the version on Blue Train. But other soloists have treated it as a standard, particularly since the 1970s. It has been recorded by such artists as McCoy Tyner (on Supertrios, 1977, and Passion Dance, 1978), Harry Connick, Jr (on 25, 1992), Dexter Gordon (on Manhattan Symphonie, 1978), George Coleman (on Playing Changes, 1979), Anthony Braxton (on Seven Standards, 1985), Fred Hersch (on Fred Hersch trio plays..., 1994), Mark Turner (on Yam Yam, 1994), Arturo Sandoval (on Swingin', 1996), US Navy Commodores Jazz Ensemble (on Sessions on M Street S.E., 1998), Keith Jarrett in a November 1998 performance in Newark, NJ (not released until 2018 on ECM Records' After the Fall), and Billy Hart (on Quartet, 2005).

Style
"Moment's Notice" contains "unusual and quick-moving harmonic twists", according to Martin and Waters.

References

Hard bop jazz standards
Compositions by John Coltrane
1950s jazz standards